The legacy and memory of Napoleon covers the historiography of the French emperor Napoleon Bonaparte (1769–1821), as well as his legacy and the uses made of his memory from his death to the present. It is a highly polarized topic—Napoleon is typically loved or hated with few nuances. The large and steadily expanding historiography in French, English, Russian, Spanish and other languages has been summarized and evaluated by numerous scholars.

Legacy and evaluation

Harsh criticism

In the political realm, historians debate whether Napoleon was "an enlightened despot who laid the foundations of modern Europe" or "a megalomaniac who wrought greater misery than any man before the coming of Hitler".  Napoleon had grandiose foreign policy ambitions across Europe and the Americas. The Continental powers as late as 1808 were willing to give him nearly all of his gains and titles, but he was overly aggressive and pushed for too much, until his empire collapsed.

Although Napoleon did end lawlessness and disorder in post-Revolutionary France, his enemies attacked him as a tyrant and usurper. His critics charge that he was not troubled when faced with the prospect of war and death for thousands, turned his search for undisputed rule into a series of conflicts throughout Europe and ignored treaties and conventions alike. His role in the Haitian Revolution and decision to reinstate slavery in France's overseas colonies are controversial and affect his reputation.

Napoleon institutionalized plunder of conquered territories: he loaded French museums with art stolen from across Europe. Artefacts were brought to the Musée du Louvre for a grand central museum; an example which would later be followed by others.  Claude Ribbe in 2005 argued that his racism toward blacks inspired Hitler in his treatment of Jews.  David G. Chandler, a historian of Napoleonic warfare, wrote in 1973 that, "Nothing could be more degrading to the former [Napoleon] and more flattering to the latter [Hitler]. The comparison is odious. On the whole Napoleon was inspired by a noble dream, wholly dissimilar from Hitler's ... Napoleon left great and lasting testimonies to his genius—in codes of law and national identities which survive to the present day. Adolf Hitler left nothing but destruction."

Critics argue Napoleon's true legacy must reflect the loss of status for France and needless deaths brought by his rule: historian Victor Davis Hanson writes, "After all, the military record is unquestioned—17 years of wars, perhaps six million Europeans dead, France bankrupt, her overseas colonies lost."

McLynn states that, "He can be viewed as the man who set back European economic life for a generation by the dislocating impact of his wars." Vincent Cronin replies that such criticism relies on the flawed premise that Napoleon was responsible for the wars which bear his name, when in fact France was the victim of a series of coalitions that aimed to destroy the ideals of the Revolution.

British military historian Correlli Barnett calls him "a social misfit" who exploited France for his personal megalomaniac goals. He says Napoleon's reputation is exaggerated. French scholar Jean Tulard provided an influential account of his image as a saviour. Louis Bergeron has praised the numerous changes he made to French society, especially regarding the law as well as education. His greatest failure was the Russian invasion. Many historians have blamed Napoleon's poor planning, but Russian scholars instead emphasize the Russian response, noting the notorious winter weather was just as hard on the defenders.

American historian Paul Schroeder (1927–2020) is willing to grant that Napoleon was a genius regarding "military, administrative, organizational, political, even literary [efforts]....[with] an extraordinary capacity for planning, decision making, memory, work, mastery of detail, and leadership." The problem is that he used this genius for criminal ends: ...he repeatedly and deliberately violated the neutrality of small states; that he resorted to judicial arrests and murders against foreign subjects; that he ordered his generals and satraps to use preventive terror to control their domains; that he not only conquered and suppressed other states in war, but also used tactics of bullying, manipulation, and extortion on them in times of peace, almost without regard to whether they were hostile or friendly; that he frequently violated understandings, promises, and treaty commitments; that on principle he ruthlessly subordinated the interests of all the states and peoples he ruled to those of France and ultimately of himself personally....[and so on].

Propaganda and memory

Napoleon's use of propaganda contributed to his rise to power, legitimated his régime, and established his image for posterity. Strict censorship, controlling aspects of the press, books, theatre, and art were part of his propaganda scheme, aimed at portraying him as bringing desperately wanted peace and stability to France. The propagandistic rhetoric changed in relation to events and to the atmosphere of Napoleon's reign, focusing first on his role as a general in the army and identification as a soldier, and moving to his role as emperor and a civil leader. Specifically targeting his civilian audience, Napoleon fostered a relationship with the contemporary art community, taking an active role in commissioning and controlling different forms of art production to suit his propaganda goals.

In Britain, Russia and across Europe—though not in France—Napoleon was a popular topic of caricature.

After Nazi Germany conquered France in 1940, Hitler marched in triumph in Paris and paid homage to Napoleon at Les Invalides.

Reduced to a fictional character, the new image of Napoleon became not a world historical figure but an intimate one, fashioned by individuals' needs and consumed as popular entertainment. In their attempts to represent the emperor as a figure of national unity, proponents and detractors of the Third Republic used the legend as a vehicle for exploring anxieties about gender and fears about the processes of democratization that accompanied this new era of mass politics and culture.

French remembrance and evaluation

Hazareesingh (2004) explores how Napoleon's image and memory are best understood. They played a key role in collective political defiance of the Bourbon restoration monarchy in 1815–1830. People from different walks of life and areas of France, particularly Napoleonic veterans, drew on the Napoleonic legacy and its connections with the ideals of the 1789 Revolution.

Widespread rumours of Napoleon's return from St. Helena and Napoleon as an inspiration for patriotism, individual and collective liberties, and political mobilization manifested themselves in seditious materials, displaying the tricolor and rosettes. There were also subversive activities celebrating anniversaries of Napoleon's life and reign and disrupting royal celebrations—they demonstrated the prevailing and successful goal of the varied supporters of Napoleon to constantly destabilize the Bourbon regime.

Datta (2005) shows that, following the collapse of militaristic Boulangism in the late 1880s, the Napoleonic legend was divorced from party politics and revived in popular culture. Concentrating on two plays and two novels from the period—Victorien Sardou's Madame Sans-Gêne (1893), Maurice Barrès's Les Déracinés (1897), Edmond Rostand's L'Aiglon (1900), and André de Lorde and Gyp's Napoléonette (1913)—Datta examines how writers and critics of the Belle Époque exploited the Napoleonic legend for diverse political and cultural ends.

International Napoleonic Congresses take place regularly, with participation by members of the French and American military, French politicians and scholars from different countries.

Napoleon died on May 5, 1821. The anniversary 200 years later on May 5, 2021, saw France deeply divided over his memory and heritage.

President Charles de Gaulle disapproved of Napoleon. While noting Napoleon's genius, de Gaulle wrote that "he left France smaller than he had found her". Other French presidents have usually avoided mention of Napoleon; for a conservative to praise him would often mean counterattacks from the left, and vice versa for left-wing politicians who are typically critical of the emperor. President Emmanuel Macron has praised him, saying that "Napoleon is the man who gave shape to our political and administrative organization, to the uncertain sovereignty that emerged from the Revolution....After months of failure, with France besieged, Napoleon was able to incarnate order." The remarks were criticized, especially on the issues of Haiti, slavery and race. Macron subsequently clarified his comments, stating that the restoration of slavery in 1802 was a “mistake, a betrayal of the spirit of the Enlightenment.”

Long-term influence outside France

Napoleon was responsible for spreading the values of the French Revolution to other countries, especially in legal reform. Napoleon did not touch serfdom in Russia.

After the fall of Napoleon, not only was the Napoleonic Code retained by conquered countries including the Netherlands, Belgium, parts of Italy and Germany, but has been used as the basis of certain parts of law outside Europe including the Dominican Republic, the US state of Louisiana and the Canadian province of Quebec. The code was also used as a model in many parts of Latin America.

The memory of Napoleon in Poland is favorable, for his support for independence and opposition to Russia, his legal code, the abolition of serfdom, and the introduction of modern middle class bureaucracies.

Napoleon indirectly began the process of Latin American independence when he invaded Spain in 1808. The abdication of King Charles IV and his son, Ferdinand VII created a power vacuum that was filled by native born political leaders such as Simón Bolívar and José de San Martín. Such leaders embraced nationalistic sentiments that were influenced by French nationalism and fought for independence which ultimately succeeded.

Everett Rummage says Napoleon, “is nearly synonymous with the spread of the modern bureaucratic state, not only the institutions themselves, but the modern outlook that goes with them: meritocracy, liberal property rights, public service and equality before the law.”

Germany 

Napoleon's disruptions of the old order created the space in which modern Germany was created. According to Katherine Aaslestad and Karen Hagemann:
1806 was a transformative year for German central Europe. It brought humiliating military defeat and occupation for Prussia, the demise of the Holy Roman Empire, and a complete territorial and structural reorganization for the region. Historians have long viewed this reorganization as essential for the rise of
 German nationalism, state-building, and modernization.

For example, British historian T. C. W. Blanning argues that Napoleon's actions in Germany did speed up the emergence of a German national consciousness; on the other hand it did nothing to modernize Germany's governance, economy, or culture.

A major product of the French occupation was a strong development in German nationalism which eventually turned the German Confederation into the German Empire after a series of conflicts and other political developments. German Romanticism was nationalistic and therefore became hostile to the ideals French Revolution. Major Romantic thinkers especially Ernst Moritz Arndt (1769-1860), Johann Gottlieb Fichte (1762-1814), Heinrich von Kleist (1777-1811), and Friedrich Schleiermacher (1768–1834) embraced reactionary politics and were hostile to political liberalism, rationalism, neoclassicism, and cosmopolitanism. 

In recent decades German historiography has shifted from nationalism to a pan-European viewpoint, opening the way for more favourable treatment of the Emperor.  Most recent scholars reject the old notion of separate national paths typified by models of the German "Sonderweg" or the French "singularité française."

Napoleon installed his relatives in power across the expanded empire. Jérôme Bonaparte, the youngest brother, became King of Westphalia and has the reputation of a playboy. However Owen Connelly examines the financial, military, and administrative performance to conclude that he was loyal, useful, and a soldierly asset to Napoleon.

Poland 
Emperor Napoleon left a significant mark on Polish National Romanticism. The Polish–Lithuanian Commonwealth was partitioned between Austria, Prussia and Russia in 1795, while Napoleon was rising in France. From the beginning Napoleon showed great sympathy for the cause of Polish independence, an declared the restoration of and independent Poland as one of his goals. 

After defeating the Kingdom of Prussia, Napoleon created the Duchy of Warsaw, a Polish State.
Bonaparte regarded the Poles as his most loyal subjects and allies. Many Polish generals and leaders, such as Józef Poniatowski and Jan Henryk Dąbrowski, which are regarded as Polish National heroes, fought alongside Napoleon, with the goal of restoring the ancient Polish State.

Many Polish Legionaires followed Napoleon into exile to Elba, and returned with him to France. Famously, Józef Poniatowski and many of his Polish Lancers died fighting for Napoleon in Leipzig. 

Today, Napoleon is remembered in Poland as an important figure in the fight for independence, even being mentioned in the 2nd stanca of the Polish National Anthem.

United States

Napoleon significantly aided the United States when he agreed to sell the territory of Louisiana for $15 million during the presidency of Thomas Jefferson. The sale meant that his archenemy Great Britain would not get the land. That territory opened the area west of the Mississippi River and almost doubled the size of the United States.

The New England Federalists who had strongly opposed the French Revolution in the 1790s celebrated in 1815 that the old Bourbon kings had been restored.

Napoleon's memory was salient in the 1820s and 1830s. Americans read his biographies, looked at exhibits—especially copies of Jacques-Louis David's painting of his coronation. American tourists in France looked for his memorials.  On the other hand, Thomas Jefferson hated Napoleon for killing off republicanism in France and returning to monarchy.  As presidents, Jefferson and Madison were at several points on the verge of war with Napoleon before 1812 in response to violations of America's neutral rights such as seizing ships and cargoes and imprisoning sailors. Finally Madison made the decision was to fight only Britain.

The art and politics of painting Napoleon

Napoleon has become a worldwide cultural icon generally associated with tactical brilliance, ambition and political power. His distinctive features and costume have made him a very recognizable figure in popular culture. He has been portrayed in many works of fiction, his depiction varying greatly with the author's perception of the historical character. In the 1927 film Napoleon, young general Bonaparte is portrayed as a heroic visionary. On the other hand, he has been occasionally reduced to a stock character, depicted as short and bossy, sometimes comically so.

Antoine-Jean Gros (1771–1835) witnessed the Battle of Arcole (1796). and painted a portrait that pleased Napoleon. After travelling with Napoleon's army, Gros produced several large paintings of battles and other events in Napoleon's life. "Napoléon on the Battlefield of Eylau" was a realistic portrayal of the horrors of war.  According to Jill Morris, Napoleon commissioned Gros to paint "Bonaparte Visiting the Plague Victims of Jaffa" (1804) to neutralize British propaganda. The propaganda focused on two episodes of the Egyptian campaign (1798-1800). First when he ordered the massacre of Turkish prisoners. Second when he ordered the death by poison of French soldiers suffering from the plague. The painting showed a compassionate Napoleon visiting the sick at the plague hospital. Morris adds that Gros was probably using the disease as a metaphor for the vanity of Napoleon and his First Empire.

Jacques-Louis David already was well established in 1799 when he met Napoleon. He was commissioned to commemorate the daring crossing of the Alps. The crossing had allowed the French to surprise the Austrian army and win victory at the Battle of Marengo on 14 June 1800. Although Napoleon had crossed on a mule, he wanted to be portrayed "calm upon a fiery steed". David complied with Napoleon Crossing the Saint-Bernard. After the proclamation of the Empire in 1804, David became the official court painter of the regime.

Jean-Auguste-Dominique Ingres (1780–1867) was a Romantic painter whose famous portrait of Napoleon I on his Imperial Throne, 1806, consists of a head but practically nothing of his body. It concentrated almost entirely on the lavish imperial costume that Napoleon had chosen to wear, and the symbols of power he held. The scepter of Charles V, the sword of Charlemagne the rich fabrics, furs and capes, crown of gold leaves, golden chains and emblems were all presented in extremely precise detail; the Emperor's face and hands were almost lost in the majestic costume.  For Susan Siegfried (2006), the painting shows not just a man but the complexity and glory of his new empire. All the insignia convey the inter-relations of old French traditions and the new imperial formation in which Napoleon provided the brain but many others helped create the Empire.  Siegfried argues that before 1789 royal portraits focused on the king's body. However, “in the wake of the French Revolution, the signification of kingship began to be displaced from the body of the ruler to the trappings of rule. In the case of Ingres’s remarkable portrait … the sacrality of the new ruler was displaced to the secular realm of history and, more specifically, to the pose, insignia, and costume that denoted the emperor’s status....“The state was no longer equated with the person or the body Napoleon as the speaking subject …, but rather with the nation, via its history.”

See also
 Cultural depictions of Napoleon
 Napoleon I on His Imperial Throne, a painting
 Napoleonland, a proposed theme park; it has not yet been approved
 Origins of the War of 1812

Notes

Further reading

Biographies in English
 Cronin, Vincent. Napoleon (HarperCollins, 1994), biography online
 Englund, Steven. Napoleon (2003) biography; online 
 McLynn, Frank. Napoleon (1998), hostile biography. online
 Roberts, Andrew. Napoleon: A Life. (Penguin, 2014), favorable biography.
 , 412 pp.; by an Oxford scholar
, favorable biography.

Memory and evaluations
 Alexander, Robert S. Napoleon (Oxford UP, 2001), examines major debates among historians.
 Arnold, E.A.  "English Language Napoleonic Historiography, 1973–1998: Thoughts and Considerations". Proceedings-Western Society for French History, Vol. 26 (2000). pp. 283–94. online
 Blanning, T. C. W. “The French Revolution and the Modernization of Germany.” Central European History 22#2 (1989), pp. 109–129. 
 Chew III, William L. "Yankee Observers, Napoleon, and American Exceptionalism." Napoleonica LaRevue 1 (2011): 23–48. online
 Cohen, Roger. "France Battles Over Whether to Cancel or Celebrate Napoleon: President Emmanuel Macron laid a wreath at the emperor’s tomb on the 200th anniversary of his death, stepping into a national debate over the legacy of Napoleon." The New York Times May 5, 2021
 de Bertier de Sauvigny, Guillaume. "The American Press and the Fall of Napoleon in 1814." Proceedings of the American Philosophical Society 98: 5 (1954): 337–376. 
 Dunne, John. "Recent Napoleonic Historiography: 'Poor Relation' Makes Good?" French History (2004) 18#4 pp. 484–91.  
 
 
 Englund, Steven. "Napoleon and Hitler". Journal of the Historical Society (2006) 6#1 pp. 151–69. 
 Englund, Steven. “Monstre Sacré: The Question of Cultural Imperialism and the Napoleonic Empire.” Historical Journal 51: 1 (2008): 215–250. 
 Forrest,  Alan, et al. eds. War Memories: The Revolutionary and Napoleonic Wars in Modern European Culture (2012)
 Forrest,  Alan, et al. eds. Soldiers, Citizens and Civilians: Experiences and Perceptions of the Revolutionary and Napoleonic Wars, 1790–1820 (Palgrave Macmillan UK, 2009)
 , considers major scholarly histories
 Glad, Betty. “Why Tyrants Go Too Far: Malignant Narcissism and Absolute Power.” Political Psychology 23: 1 (2002): 1-37. online
 Hagemann, Karen. Revisiting Prussia's Wars against Napoleon: History, Culture, and Memory (2015)
 
  excerpt and text search
 Hazareesingh, Sudhir. "Memory and Political Imagination: The Legend of Napoleon Revisited", French History (2004) 18#4 pp. 463–83.
 
 Klopfer, Nadine. "Remembering Napoleon: Americans and the French Emperor in the 1820s and 1830s." Early American Studies 18.4 (2020): 525–560. excerpt
 Luke, Tarah Lorraine. "‘Our Bonaparte?’: Republicanism, Religion, and Paranoia in New England and the Mid-Atlantic, 1789–1830." (Ph D dissertation 2016, Florida State U.) online.
 O'Flaherty, Kathleen. "The Genesis of the Napoleonic Legend." Studies: An Irish Quarterly Review 58.231 (1969): 256-266. , regarding French literature
 Schönpflug, Daniel. "So far, and yet so near: comparison, transfer and memory in recent German books on the age of the French revolution and Napoleon." French History 18.4 (2004): 446-462. 
 Schroeder, Paul W. “Napoleon’s Foreign Policy: A Criminal Enterprise.” Journal of Military History 54: 2 (1990): 147–162. 
 Shulim, Joseph I. “Thomas Jefferson Views Napoleon.” Virginia Magazine of History and Biography 60:2 (1952): 288–304. {{jstor}4245839}}
 Woolf, Stuart. “The Construction of a European World-View in the Revolutionary-Napoleonic Years.” Past & Present 137 (1992): 72-101.

Art
 

 Carruthers, H. A. Napoleon on campaign : classic images of Napoleon at war (Pen & Sword Military, 2014).
 Datta, Venita. "'L'appel Au Soldat': Visions of the Napoleonic Legend in Popular Culture of the Belle Epoque". French Historical Studies 2005 28#1: 1–30.
 Forrest,  Alan. "Propaganda and the Legitimation of Power in Napoleonic France". French History, 2004 18(4): 426–45.
 Munhall, Edgar. "Portraits of Napoleon." Yale French Studies 26 (1960): 3-20. 
 O'Brien, David. "Propaganda and the Republic of the Arts in Antoine-Jean Gros's Napoleon visiting the Battlefield of Eylau the Morning after the Battle." French Historical Studies 26.2 (2003): 281-314.
 Porterfield, Todd, and  Susan Siegfried. Staging Empire: Napoleon, Ingres, and David (Penn State Press, 2006) online review.
 Prendergast, Christopher. Napoleon and history painting: Antoine-Jean Gros's La bataille d'Eylau (Oxford UP, 1997).
 Quynn, Dorothy Mackay. "The art confiscations of the Napoleonic wars." American Historical Review 50.3 (1945): 437-460. 
 Rosenblum, R. "Inherited myths, unprecedented realities: Painting under Napoleon 1800-1814." Art in America (1975): 48-57. .  Stresses its morbid, erotic, spectacular, and fantastic aspects.

External links

  "Lesson of the Day: ‘France Battles Over Whether to Cancel or Celebrate Napoleon’ In this lesson, students will learn about the legacy of the former French emperor and debate to what extent he should be commemorated or criticized." New York Times, May 7, 2021
 Napoleon Series
 The Napoleonic Guide
 International Napoleonic Society
 Alan Schom Interview on his book Napoleon Bonaparte on Booknotes, 26 October 1997
 
 "Napoleon and Wellington", BBC Radio 4 discussion with Andrew Roberts, Mike Broer and Belinda Beaton (In Our Time, 25 October 2001) -->

Napoleon
Cultural depictions of Napoleon
Paintings of Napoleon